Jerwood Prize may refer to:

 the Jerwood Applied Arts Prize, awarded by the Jerwood Foundation
 the Jerwood Drawing Prize
 the Jerwood Fiction Uncovered Prize
 the Jerwood Painting Prize
 the Jerwood Sculpture Prize
 the Jerwood Prize for Non-fiction or Jerwood Award
 the Jerwood Prize for Traditional Arts, awarded to a student at the Prince's School of Traditional Arts in London
 the Jerwood/Photoworks Awards, awarded by the Jerwood Charitable Foundation and Photoworks, for photography